Jan Yulianovich Kryzhevski (born 1948) is a Russian painter.

Biography
Jan Yulianovich Kryjevski was born on April 8, 1948, in Ufa, Russia. From 1965 to 1969, he studied at the Ufa Art School. Then he moved to Riga, the capital of Latvia, and studied at the T.E. Zalkalna Latvian Academy of Arts, where he remained until 1972.

Kryjevski began his artistic career in 1973. His first big break came in 1976 with the exhibition of his original work titled "New Day" in the Central Exhibition Hall, for which he was awarded first prize at the Russian Competition for Young Artists and also first prize at the Union Competition for Young Artists.

In 1977, Kryjevski moved to Vologda, where he worked until 1987 when he moved to Yaroslavl and, shortly thereafter, Leningrad. From 1978 until 1981, he served as Chairman of the youth section of the Vologda branch of the Union of Artists of the RSFSR. He also founded the young Russian Artists Club in Vologda and started an exhibition for young artists in Petrozavodsk, Archangel, Leningrad, and Ufa.

From 1976 to 1987, he took part in regional, state, national and foreign exhibitions. His works have been exhibited in Bulgaria, Hungary, Finland, Romania, Germany, Mongolia, France and Italy.

In 1977, Kryjevski spent time working in a group of young artists at the dacha for creative talents "Senezh" near Moscow, where the artistic concept of Transrealism was first created and developed. In 1987, he landed in Leningrad, where he became one of the original organizers of the Association of Artists known as the "Black Box". Starting in 1988, Kryjevski took part in exhibitions by Leningrad artists, particularly avant-garde groups that exhibited their works both in Russian and abroad. In 1989, his work was shown at the exhibition at the House of Friendship of Peoples in the newly renamed St. Petersburg. In 1991, he exhibited in the "Artists of Petersburg and Restructuring" show, at the Salon Drouot in Paris, at the exhibition "Petersburg Artists in Helsinki" in Helsinki, and at a solo show at the Salon "Nimble" in New York City.

Since 1991, Kryjevski has lived and worked in Brooklyn, New York. In 1992, his works were shown as part of the city's largest annual exhibition, held at the Jacob Javits Center. Certain of his paintings have been auctioned by Christie's in 1990 and by Sotheby's in 1992.
However, all this, at the moment, did not give financial independence and, moreover, even a livelihood.
In December 2014, Kryzhevsky Ya. Yu. with the direct help of Channel One and the program "Male and Female" he returned to Russia.
A number of Kryjevski's works are in the collection of the State Tretyakov Gallery, the collections of the Bashkir GHM, the MV Nesterov, and the city museums of Petrozavodsk, Yaroslavl, Vologda, and Novosibirsk. Many of his works are also in private collections in Russia and abroad, including collections in Austria, Belgium, United States, France, Sweden, and Finland.

Creativity
 Witnessed UFO [1]
 White Nights Vologda. 1980-1981. Oil on canvas. 81x96. Vologda regional picture gallery. Inv. № 914-F V0KG.
 Edge of oil's. Moscow, 1974.
 Fresh morning's. Moscow, 1974.
 Rig, c. Moscow, 1974.
 Raw field x. Moscow, 1974.
 November melting snow, x. Moscow, 1974.
 Ural horizons, x. Moscow, 1975.
 New day's. Moscow, 1976.

Honors and awards
Lenin Komsomol Award (1976), received for the paintings "Ufa horizons" and "Blue and white day".

Exhibitions
Republican, Ufa, with 1970–1976 years.
Fine Arts Exhibition "Ural socialist", Ufa, 1974.
Russian Art Exhibition, Moscow, 1975.
Russian art exhibition "Youth of Russia", Moscow, 1976.
Union Art Exhibition "The youth of the country", Moscow, 1976.
Union Art Exhibition "In Lenin's path", dedicated to the 60th anniversary of the October Revolution, Moscow, 1977.
Exhibition of young artists from the Academy of Arts of the USSR, East Germany, Berlin, 1976.

References
 Between friends. Jubilee exhibition of Vologda and northeast artists. Miskolc. Catalog. 1989. C.12.
 Shalyto I. In flight over the chaos. / / Art of Leningrad. L., 1990. - № 6. - P.32 - 33.
 Art Vologda land 13th-20th centuries. Exhibition catalog / Authors-Voropanov VV Panteleev AV Rybakov AA Moscow, Soviet artist. 1990. S. 168.
 Voropanov V.V. Secret transrealnoy painting / / Steps. Vologda, № 32. 19.08. 2004. C. 12.
 Magazine "Art", 1976, № 12. A. Rozhin: Russian Youth.
 Magazine "Artist", 1976, № 11. Kiselev: Landscape painting.
 Magazine "Pioneer", 1976, № 11. S. Sakharov: A window open to the world.
 Magazine "Spark", 1976, № 6. Painting "Ufa horizons."
 Magazine "Spark", 1976, № 42. Reproduction of "New Day."
 Magazine "Soviet soldier", 1976, № 11. Reproduction of "New Home."

External links
 Private Gallery Marina Kuzhman
  Vadim Chernobrov, "Kosmopoisk" Chronicles of UFO visits

1948 births
Living people
20th-century Russian painters
Russian male painters
21st-century Russian painters
20th-century Russian male artists
21st-century Russian male artists